The Palazzo Borgherini-Rosselli del Turco is a Renaissance-style palace located in central Florence, region of Tuscany, Italy. It stands beside the church of Santi Apostoli. The palace was designed by Baccio d'Agnolo. From this palace, in 1529, were expropriated the chests containing panels painted by Jacopo Pontormo for the Borgherini.

The nearby Palazzo Bartolini Salimbeni on Piazza Santa Trinita was also designed by Baccio d'Agnolo

References

Buildings and structures completed in 1507
Houses completed in the 16th century
Borgherini-Rosselli del Turco
Renaissance architecture in Florence